The Trusina massacre occurred on 16 April 1993 in the village of Trusina, located in the municipality of Konjic in Bosnia and Herzegovina, where 22 people, four Croat soldiers and 18 Croat civilians, were killed by the Army of the Republic of Bosnia and Herzegovina (ARBiH) during the Croat–Bosniak War.

Background

On 16 April 1993, between 8 and 9am, an engagement between the Army of the Republic of Bosnia and Herzegovina (ARBiH) and the forces of the Croatian Defence Council began. After the first few hours of the battle, ARBiH troops broke the Croatian defense, and captured Croat soldiers. Eighteen civilians, including two children, and four captured Croat fighters were killed in various locations during and/or after the battle.  The remaining civilians, mostly women and children were detained in several private houses, and later released from the village.

Trials
The Prosecution of Bosnia and Herzegovina charged six members of the Bosnian army's "Zulfikar" special unit including Mensur Memić, Dževad Salčin, Nedžad Hodžić, Senad Hakalović, Nihad Bojadžić and Zulfikar Ališpago for the murder of 22 people, including four HVO members and 18 civilians. Two other suspects, Edin Džeko and Rasema Handanović  were extradited from the US for their alleged involvement. 

In April 2012, Rasema Handanović pleaded guilty to killing Croat civilians and prisoners of war, expressing "deep regret" for her actions. She was sentenced to five and a half years imprisonment after she agreed to testify against the "Zulfikar" unit members in a plea bargain.

In September 2015, Memić, Hodžić, and Bojadžić were found guilty of killing of prisoners of war and civilians during a "preplanned and prepared attack against the Croat population of the village of Trusina". The trial verdict was upheld in January 2017.

References

External links

Massacres in the Bosnian War
1993 in Bosnia and Herzegovina
Massacres in 1993
Bosniak war crimes in the Bosnian War
April 1993 events in Europe
Conflicts in 1993
Massacres of Croats